Eta Canis Majoris (η Canis Majoris, abbreviated Eta CMa, η CMa), also named Aludra , is a star in the constellation of Canis Major. Since 1943, the spectrum of this star has served as one of the stable anchor points by which other stars are classified.

Nomenclature
η Canis Majoris (Latinised to Eta Canis Majoris) is the star's Bayer designation.

The traditional name Aludra originates from the Arabic: العذراء al-adhraa, 'the virgin'. This star, along with Epsilon Canis Majoris (Adhara), Delta Canis Majoris (Wezen) and Omicron2 Canis Majoris (Thanih al Adzari), were Al 'Adhārā (العذاري), 'the Virgins'. In 2016, the International Astronomical Union organized a Working Group on Star Names (WGSN) to catalog and standardize proper names for stars. The WGSN's first bulletin of July 2016 included a table of the first two batches of names approved by the WGSN; which included Aludra for this star.

Properties

A blue-white supergiant, Eta CMa has been used as a standard for the spectral type of B5Ia.

Eta CMa shines brightly in the skies in spite of a large distance from Earth due to being intrinsically many times brighter than the Sun. It has a luminosity over 100,000 times and a radius around 54 times that of the Sun.  It has only been around a fraction of the time the Sun has, less than 10 million years, yet is already in the last stages of its life. It is still expanding and may become a red supergiant, or perhaps has already passed that phase, but in either case it will become a supernova within the next few million years.

Eta CMa is classified as an Alpha Cygni-type variable star and its brightness varies from magnitude +2.38 to +2.48 over a period of 4.7 days.

Namesakes
Both USS Aludra (AF-55), an Alstede-class stores ship, and USS Aludra (AK-72), a Crater-class cargo ship, were U.S. Navy vessels named after the star.

References

Alpha Cygni variables
Canis Majoris, Eta
B-type supergiants
Canis Major
Canis Majoris, 31
058350
035904
Aludra
2827
CD-29 04328